Knights of the Golden Spur (Hungarian: aranysarkantyús lovag, Latin: eques auratus, or eques aureatus) were persons knighted during the ceremony of Hungarian kings' coronations. It was not a regular knightly order, its membership did not result in any special privileges or duties. The knightly title was not hereditary, it was given only for a personal use. However, the knights were authorized, to wear real golden spurs, attached to their boots at the ceremony, and they also wore a small golden spur on their hats.

Insignia

They did not have any regular insignia, though it had been claimed several times. On 21 April 1918 Charles IV of Hungary created a decorative medal for them as a memorial insignia to his 30 December 1916 coronation in Budapest.

The preparations for the design begun in 1917, by Joseph Hoffmann, a professor from Vienna. The first proposal was submitted to Baron Rhemen, who was responsible for the issue in June 1917, and a compromise agreement was reached in December. Rhemen ordered to supplement the badge with olive branches, but they were omitted in the final version. The minutes of the 35th session of the Council of Ministers of 26 October 1917 inform us, that badges have already been completed. The statute of Charles IV about the decorative medal of knights of the golden spur was finally issued on 21 April 1918. Accordingly, the decorative medal had to be worn in the neck, on the ribbon of the Order of Saint Stephen. The hand written royal decree of 10 April 1918 allows that the decorative medal may be retained, and passed over to the heirs of the bearer as a gift. Later on, the Hungarian Prime Minister Sándor Wekerle was authorized to handled the affairs of the knights.

From the 12–13 December 1917 correspondence of Count Otokar Czernin, Minister in the personal service of the ruler, and the Minister of Foreign Affairs, and Count Aladár Zichy, the Minister in the personal service of the King, we know the decision, how the bearers of the decorative medal have to wear the badge: "... it seems reasonable to determine precisely, that this emblem can only be worn in its original size, in the neck, and any other ways, like wearing it on the bosom or in the form of a knob made of ribbons, should be avoided under all circumstances." The ministerial summary also emphasizes that, despite its ornate design, the badge hasn't been regarded as a badge of an order, but rather as a wearable memorial item.

The medal from the front side shows a white enameled double cross, with the letter K (Károly) in the middle. Above the cross was placed the Holy Crown of Hungary, and the cross is surrounded by a green enameled dragon, symbolizing the Order of the Dragon. The dragon and the cross are by three quarters surrounded by an ornate golden spur. The height of the memorial sign is 67 mm, the width is 44 mm. It was worn on the red ribbon (wide 40–50 mm or more), lined by green (the ribbon of Order of Saint Stephen of Hungary). On the back side of the medal, only the dragon was worked up in detail. At that time, gold and silver honors began to be replaced by bronze and zinc, and only the highest orders were made from precious metals.

The Bachruch company in Budapest has been entrusted with the production of the decorative medals. Despite the approval of April 1918 and the finished production of the badges by the end of 1917, the distribution still has not been made. According to a letter of 23 October 1918, the Bachruch company indicated that because of the blockade on silkware they can not deliver the badges. On 13 November 1918 they sent another negative answer regarding the acquisition of ribbons, although the badge was the same as the neck-ribbon of the middle cross of the long existing Royal Hungarian Order of Saint Stephen. All this perfectly reflects the extent of the lack of raw materials (and the negative effects of accumulation of goods) at the end of the World War. Finally, the knights got their badges only since February 1920. (Meantime the main events were the end of the world war, the end of the Austro-Hungarian Empire, the rise and end of the Hungarian Soviet Republic, the Treaty of Trianon, and the beginning of the new Kingdom of Hungary.)

The history of the order
The legend of the knights of the golden spur dates back to the Battle of the Milvian Bridge in Rome, which took place on October 28, 312 (some older chroniclers stated the year incorrectly as 265), when Constantine I (306–337), co-ruler of the Roman Empire (with territorial power in the provinces of Gallia, Britannia and Germania) defeated Maxentius (306–312), another co-ruler (with territorial power in Italia and the African provinces), who fell from the bridge to the Tiber during the battle and drowned. Subsequently, Constantine became Augustus (emperor) of the Western Roman Empire, and later on declared Christianity as official state religion. According to the chronicles of Eusebius of Caesarea (c. 265-1339) and Lactantius (c. 250–325), Constantine and his soldiers had a vision the night before the battle, sent by the Christian God. This was interpreted as a promise of victory if the heavenly sign of the Chi-Rho, the first two letters of Christ's name in Greek, was painted on the soldiers' shields, to fight under the protection of the Christian God. (According to Eusebius, Constantine with his army was marching to Rome, when he looked up to the sun and saw a cross of light above it, and with it the Greek words "Εν Τούτῳ Νίκα", usually translated into Latin as "in hoc signo vinces", that is, "Through this sign [you shall] conquer".) The medieval chroniclers believed, that the knights of the golden spur can be originated from the "Militia Aurata" (golden knighthood), created by Emperor Constantine, who fought with him in the battle. At the time of the pontificate of Pope Sylvester I (314–335) the city of Rome started to be converted to Christianity. The pope was great patron of Militia Aurata, who also assisted to secure his power. The late Middle Ages and New Age historians placed knights of the golden spur at the top of the chivalric virtues (and anachronistically they also originated the papal Order of the Golden Spur from pope Sylvester I). As a result, various societies of the knights of the golden spur were formed one after another. Maybe there was an aim to commemorate the (wrongly stated) year 265, when in Rome 265 knights of the golden spur were created after the coronation of emperor Frederick III by Pope Nicholas V. The knighting ceremony took place 19 March 1452 at the Bridge of Hadrian, and the new emperor granted the knights with golden spur hanging from the cross. (Earlier, in 1433 at the same place emperor Sigismund created there more than 200 knights.)

We can see creation of knights as part of the coronation ceremony in the Czech Kingdom during the rule of Venceslaus II already in 1297 (Knights of St. Venceslaus, repeated by John of Bohemia in 1311, and Sigismund in 1420, then by almost all Czech kings), as well as in Poland in 1311 (as a result of the Hungarian influence).

The origins of different knights of golden spur may be in some way related to various orders of St George. Pierre Hélyot (and others) saw connections between the Order of Constantine (Ordre de Constantin), "founded" by the Emperor Constantine I, and knights of golden spur, as well as the different orders of St. George. The collane of Grand Master shows the figure of St George, slaying a dragon. (In some accounts, the Order of Constantine, known also as the Order of Golden Chivalry [in German sources called Constantinorder, earlier Angelusorden] was founded by the Byzantine Emperor Isaac II Angelos in 1190/91. The phrase angelicas [Hungarian: angelikák] also originated there. So, the order's connection to both the golden knights and St. George is obvious. Since the second wife of Isaac II Angelos was Princess Margaret of Hungary, the daughter of Béla III, the Hungarian tradition of golden knighthood and St. George may originate from this source, as well.) 

The Jesuit Melchior Inchofer writes in his work about Hungarian ecclesiastical history, at the year 1045, that King St Stephen created his son, Prince St Emeric as well as several domestic and foreign magnates Knights of the Holy Cross (Equestrem Crucigerorum), which is in Inchofer's account supported by the fact, that on some ancient pictures, the prince was shown with cross in his neck and on his coat. When Emperor Henry III reinstated King Peter to his throne (1044), several foreigners were created Knights of the Cross in the name of the King, at the Church of Mary in Fehérvár. At the same time, several Hungarian magnates were created by Henry the Knights of the Golden Spur (Ordinem Auratorum, ab insignibus, quae deaurata Calcaria sunt...), founded by Charlemagne. According to Inchofer, the Order of the Holy Cross was also greatly promoted by St. Ladislaus, who made several donations for them, and all the villages, that are named after the cross (Hungarian kereszt), gave their names as a result of these donations (Szentkereszt, Keresztúr etc.). Inchofer had collected and systematically exploited a huge amount of written sources for his work in the Vatican Archives, which are now lost for ever. For this reason, we can take into consideration his work as well. 

Inchofer makes report of another Hungarian order, the Knights of Holy Cross, but we have no other evidence whether it really existed. However, there are several older books dealing with chivalric orders that mention a certain Order of St Gerion, founded in the Holy Land. The knights were described as wearing the insignia of Hungary: Gueules, patriarchal cross Argent above a triple hill vert. Some other authors stated, they wore black patriarchal cross above a green triple hill, attached on their white cloaks, and others gave them a completely different cross. However, they do not know nothing about the origin and function of the order. The only common point is that it possibly disappeared, when the Holy Land was lost. 

So, it is possible that we can see here a reminiscence to the Order of Holy Cross, that might existed in reality, which was mixed with the legend of St Gereon.This can be supported by the opinion of Pierre Hélyot who thought that the Knights of St Gereon may be the same as the Cross-Bearers (Porte-Croix), mentioned by Inchofer in his Hungarian ecclesiastical history, since they wore similar emblem as the coat of arms of the country (Croix Patriarchale posée sur trois montagnes). He then repeats the information of Inchofer, saying that the order was founded by Saint Stephen, and the order could be originated from the cross that was sent to the king by the pope. The king was also entitled to carry this cross before him in the processions. The king was also considered the Apostle of Hungary, because his determined activities in propagation of Christianity. However, the first chivalry orders were created only during the 12th century, so Hélyot thought that the institution of Cross-Bearers was established, when Pope Sylvester II sent the crown and the cross to the king in 1000. They might be the members of his retinue, to carry the cross before the king. By the time, they might transform themselves into an order (of St Gereon) which is not existing yet. We can find nearly the same account on the knights of St Gereon (with reference to Hélyot as well) in the book of Jean Hermant.

In the modern Hungarian literature, the Order of Holy Cross was possibly mentioned first time by Gusztáv Remellay, who also presented some additional sources for its existence during the late 14th century. He stated, that in the era of king Sigismund the knights of Holy Cross still wore red cross in white field. They must still be very numerous, because King Sigismund in his Regestrum bellicum ordered them to fight under the banner of St George. By the end of the 14th century, the traditions of the knights of Holy Cross – if we can take it as authentic –
might be heavily mingled with the traditions of knights of the golden spur, and the Hungarian Knights of St George (or the Knights of Saint George might originate from the Knights of the Holy Cross). If the emblem of the Knights of Holy Cross was (double) cross (due their name), then perhaps this might be the origin of another order with the badge of double cross, the so-called Knights of St Gerion. Furthermore, they could be linked to the Hungarian Order of Saint George in a way that the Hungarian name György (en, fr: George, it: Giorgio) was misread by the foreigners, and transformed to the similarly sounding name Gerion. So, the Order of the Holy Cross might be converted by historical development to the knights of the golden spur, and the Hungarian Order of Saint George, and by means of misunderstanding to the Order of Saint Gerion. (The attributes of St Gereon are cross-flag, sword, dragon [as a reference of the defeated paganism], and cross on his breastplate. It is also possible that here we can see a Hungarian order founded to the honor of Szent Gellért in the Holy Land and/or Hungary. Its Hungarian spelling is even more closer to the name of Gereon (fr: Gérard, en: Gerard, it: Gerardo, de: Gerhard). The attributes of St Gerard are: censer, book, pieces of stone, cross. However, Gereon is more possible, according to his attributes.) 

Another common point between knights of golden spur and Knights of Saint George can be found in the Golden Legend of Saint George. The topos of the struggle with the dragon was probably brought back into Europe by crusaders. Fulcher of Chartres (c. 1059-c. 1127) in his Historia Antiochena, writes that a priest serving the crusaders marching on Jerusalem had a vision of a beauteous young man, who said him, that he is Saint George himself, the leader of the Christians, and if they will bring his relics with them to Jerusalem, he will promote them. At the siege of the city, St George appeared in white armor, decorated with a red cross, so, the encouraged besiegers who followed him, were able to take Jerusalem.

The proliferation of the story of the knight slaying a dragon, and its wide artistic presentation might be promoted mainly by the Golden Legend of Jacobus de Voragine (c. 1228–1298), the archbishop of Genoa (1292–1298), in his collection of the saints' lives (Legenda aurea or Legenda sanctorum, c. 1260). (Near to the city of Silene, in the province of Libya, there was a stagne or a pond like a sea, wherein was a dragon which envenomed all the country. To calm the dragon down, the people of the city gave to him every day two sheep, and when the sheep failed there were taken him people, chosen by lot. So it happed that one day the lot fell upon the king's daughter, whereof the king was sorry, and said unto the people: For the love of the gods take gold and silver and all that I have, and let me have my daughter. The king was refused by the angry people. The king then returned to the people and demanded eight days' respite, and they granted it to him. 
Meanwhile, St George passed by the city. When he saw the young lady he said to her: Fair daughter, doubt ye no thing hereof for I shall help thee in the name of Jesu Christ. When the dragon appeared, St George was upon his horse, and drew out his sword and garnished him with the sign of the cross, and rode hardily against the dragon which came towards him, and smote him with his spear and hurt him sore and threw him to the ground. (In some other variants, St. George killed the dragon immediately.) And after said to the maid: Deliver to me your girdle, and bind it about the neck of the dragon and be not afeard. When she had done so the dragon followed her as it had been a meek beast and debonair. Then St George said to the people: Ne doubt ye no thing, without more, believe ye in God, Jesu Christ, and do ye to be baptized and I shall slay the dragon. Then the king was baptized and all his people, and St George slew the dragon and smote off his head.)

If St George being depicted on the altarpieces, we can usually see him in the knightly armor, or with the dragon. So, St George's legend became part of the tradition of golden knighthood. He is the protector of the knights. Many ecclesiastical and secular knight orders have chosen him a patron saint (Teutonic Order, Knights of Saint George, Order of the Dragon, Order of the Garter etc.). In the lower part of the Holy Crown of Hungary, there can be seen the enameled plate of St George, as well. King Saint Stephen, in the campaign against the Bulgarians (1018), obtained the relics of Saint George and Saint Nicholas in Cesarije. In 1328, king Charles I founded his knightly society in the honor of St George. For many of the Hungarian clan monasteries and temples were also chosen St George as their patron saint. In the legend of the Báthory family St George also appears as their patron saint. (The legend from the 13th century said, Opos from this family slayed a fearful dragon living in the marsh of Ecsed, with the help of St George.) 

The sources mention the first Hungarian knights of golden spur during the coronation of Hungarian Angevin rulers, but they also indicated that this was part of the ceremony already at the time of the Arpadian kings. In 1790, the Hungarian jurist Adalbert Barics believed that they were perhaps servants of king St. Stephen, and were obliged to fight with him in the battles; or the first knights might be ordered by king St. Ladislaus to assist at the reburial of St. Stephen in 1083. According to Barics, the knights were entitled to wear golden spurs, and perhaps golden armour. They also were the only persons to enter the royal court with golden horse trappings, and for some patriotic services they had to be rewarded with two times of the value of nobles' reward. If the nobles, for example, received a gold chain worth of two hundred florins, the knights of golden spur had to be donated with a gold chain worth of four hundred florins. (It is possible that the privileges of Charles I of Hungary from 1327 to magister Doncs also belong to the tradition of the Knights of the Golden Spur. He was entitled to change the Argent parts of his coat of arms, crest and banner to Or, but only in case, if he takes part in the war by the King's side. When Charles I of Hungary died (16 July 1342), three mounted knights were set guard in front of the gates of the Buda church, to personalize the king. According to the Chronicon Pictum of Márk Kálti: "One of the gallants was adorned with a tournament dress suitable for the royal dignity, the next with a dress suitable for the spear-struggle, and the third wore the royal majesty's battle-armory... The gallants ... wore golden helmets and their crest was an ostrich [head with horseshoe in the beak]: as like as the gallant king used to wear and use them in his life. ...all these were the king's belongings during his life." According to the description, the king had a special armory for the "tornamentum"s and the "hastiludium"s, suitable for two different types of tournaments.)

The spurs were always seen as symbols of the knighthood, and some of them wore nicely ornate pieces. Representative spurs could also be made of gold. The knightly rank was mostly expressed by a golden spur. The saying "earning the spurs" also suggests that the right to wear a spur was identical with the acquisition of a knightly rank. During the 1343 Rome pilgrimage of Queen Elizabeth, the mother of king Louis the Great, her cortege was made of fifty knights of golden spur. In 1396, King Sigismund created Resti, the admiral of the Hungarian navy knight of the golden spur, in the city of Ragusa. He was given gold spurs, and gold chain. It happened at Christmas Day, when King Sigismund was presented with a piece from the Savior's sponge by the Ragusan city council. As the sign of his gratitude, the king created the town's rector (and the admiral of the Hungarian navy), Marino Resti knight of the golden spur, and ordered that this piece should always be passed over to Resti's office successors.

On 26 September 1412 Bertholo de Orsini has been taken into the Order of the Dragon, when at his request he was also allowed to see the order's original founding charter in Buda. At the same time, King Sigismund made him his counsellor (consiliariorum et athletarum nostrorum), created him knight of the golden spur (cingulo militis seu militaris preheminentie decore presentialiter adornamus, facientes tibi insignia militie et presertim calcar deauratum ad calcem sinistri pedis tui per nobilem Stephanum de Rozgon aule nostre regalis militem et de dicta societate socialem more et observantia debita in talibus et consueta coram cunctis astantibus apponi et aligari, preserving him the possibility, that – when he'll put on aureas imperatorias infulas in urbe Romana – he can put a spur on his another leg as well), furthermore, he was also belted with a sword (gladio ancipiti seu ense, cum nos bellum insigne committemus, te nobis astante statuentes expresse et hoc regio decernentes edicto). 

On 31 May 1433 Emperor Sigismund created after his coronation in Rome, at Bridge of Hadrian a great number of new knights. Some sources indicate that they were more than 200. (If we take into consideration the symbolic year 256, their number might be exactly the same, as like as at the 1452 coronation of Frederick III.) Numerous new knights were also granted Order of the Dragon.

Some coat of arms miniatures of Giovanni Francesco Capodilista also show crest and horse cloth semy of golden spurs (along with other insignia on his clothing, and his neck: Order of the Dragon, Order of the Jar, the devise of House of Lancaster the so-called SS-chain). The Capodilista arms was granted in 1434 by emperor Sigismund in Basel, and at the same time he was raised for the knight of golden spur (maybe also granted with the Order of Dragon), appointed as a royal counselor, and granted the title of Pfalzgraf. 

The baby king Ladislaus V was knighted in 1440 by Miklós Újlaki, voivode of Transylvania before his coronation. The new knights were also created by him. King Matthias made new knights not only during his coronation, but also on some festive occasions. On 24 June 1488 in Vienna (under Hungarian occupation that time) the Swiss Envoy Melchior Russ was knighted, in the presence of the courtiers and ten foreign ambassadors. He awarded the Order of the Dragon to the higher ranked persons, and also gave them fashionable golden spurs. According to a report of the Swiss ambassador Schilling, there were only 12 such knights throughout Hungary. These persons were not members of a knightly order but the personal knights of the king.

During the 15th century, creation of new knights of golden spur became regular. In some cases it happened even independently of coronation. On 28 February 1514 György Dózsa was knighted for a winning duel fought in the area of Nándorfehérvár, against 
the Ali of Epeiros, the leader of the mounted sipahis of Szendrő. As a reward, king Louis II granted him with a double service pay, golden chain, purple dress richly embroidered with gold, spur and sword. Furthermore, he also gained 200 gold florins, a village between Nándorfehérvár and Temesvár. Finally, he was entitled to augment his family coat of arms with Ali's cut off arm, as a reminder to his heroic deeds. In 1522, István Bárdi became knight in a similar way. That year, the Hungarians sought a victory against the Turkish leader Ferhates. They also captured several higher and lower ranked officers, and sent various war insignia for the king to Buda. The good news was brought to the king by Bárdi, who also showed great courage in the battle. As a reward, king Louis II renumerated him with a silvery-scabbarded sword, a gold necklace, a pair of gold spurs, and made him knight of the golden spur in presence of several high ranked noble gentlemen.

In the beginning, it was not stated in advance who will be knighted during the coronation. In 1563, at the coronation of king Maximilian I some nobles were knighted who fought successfully in Turkish wars, like György Thury, Antal Székely, László Gyulaffy and Miklós Hennyey. However, there also appeared a lot of people who were unworthy of honoring this title, but simply jostled themselves forward during the coronation, so the knighting ceremony had to be abandoned. For this reason, in later times the palatine (the military leader of the country) was entitled to choose the candidates for knighting. In 1598, Archduke Matthias made knights of golden spur Ferenc Nádasdy and Miklós Pálffy in Győr, newly recaptured from the Turks. New knights were made in 1608, during the coronation of Matthias II. 

The first statute was the 1609:73 which mentions those young nobles whom the Hungarian king used to knight after the coronation. At that time, King Matthias II obliged the new knights to pay a contribution of 12 golden florins. In 1687, Joseph, the 9 years old son of Leopold I was crowned for the king of Hungary. Since he was still a young boy, he could not create new knights. For this reason, Leopold I made him the Knight of the Order of the Golden Fleece first, and let him swore their oath, and so in the knightly sense, he now had the right to make new knights of the golden spur. For a long time, the coronation of Hungarian kings, and the new knightings took place in the Franciscan church of Pressburg, the then capital city of Hungary. Over the time, most of the knights came from the prominent families of Hungary, but almost all the social strata participated in knightings. 

According to the Hungarian jurist Ignác Kassics, in 1691 king Leopold I knighted his favorite court servant, a certain Hannibal Dascoli, but this time the primarily personal title was given to his male descendants, as well, as a reward for the military merits 
made by him and his ancestors. At the same time, he was given the ornaments of the order: belts, necklaces, rings, spurs, other ornaments of the order, and a special diploma of knightment. In 1840, Kassics also describes the insignia of the order, (probably referring back to the 1742 book of József Pintér: a cross-shaped golden "decorative medal" hanging from the gold necklace. In the middle of the cross was placed the shield of Hungary, besides a lion is standing edgewise, and above is the Holy Crown of Hungary floating. According to Kassics, in his times, the knights were also privileged, not to put off their swords when taking an oath.

Still another description says, they had a "coat of arms" in the shape of a
four-pronged gold spur [rather a cross], with a similar, but much smaller, gold spur, hanging down from one of the bigger ones [one of the cross' pronges]. The source of this description was the book by Sámuel Decsy (1742–1816), titled A magyar szent koronának és az ahoz tartozó tárgyaknak historiája (Vienna, 1792. paragraph 367), but it is just a reference to Pintér. According to Decsy, the history of the knights of golden spur earlier was described by János Decsi (Cimor) (c. 1560–1601), under the name of Baronius. However, this badge may refer to the papal knights of golden spur, because Baronius thought, the Hungarian knights of golden spur may originate from the papal order, as well. (Compare to the figure of Pintér from the year "265".) 

It seems that in the later times the badges of the knights were forgotten, because in 1792 Count Antal Cziráky (who was himself eques auratus in 1790) petitioned the court to create wearable insignia for the knights. He proposed a badge (p. 30) in the form of an eight edged Maltese cross hanging from a neck-ribbon. However, despite the repeated requests, the claim was never met, neither by Leopold II nor by his successors. Cziráky also stated, the spurs to be seen on the tombstone of prince Lőrinc Újlaki (1459/60-1524) were the original badges of knights of the golden spur. (The spurs at the tombstone of his father, Miklós Újlaki [1410 k.-1477], king of Bosnia are even more characteristic. He wears spurs unstrapped from his ankles, superimposed to the feet-armours.)

Persons to be knighted were proposed by the palatine, and later on, from the end of the 19th century by the Prime Minister. The number of the knights was different on each coronation. Albert I knighted 84 persons, Charles III 6, Maria Theresa 44 (25 nobles and 19 citizens), Leopold II 33, Francis II 48, Ferdinand I 27, Franz Joseph I 28, Charles IV. 47. In the latter coronation, all the knights came from the battlefield soldiers. Half of them originated from old noble families, and there were also soldiers from various military corps. The soldiers were allowed to left the front or the hospital facilities to participate the coronation. Originally, 51 persons received invitations, but only 47 of them arrived to the coronation in time. The intention was to raise those soldiers for knights of golden spur who already were given war medals for their valiant conduct against the enemy. They got their imaginary honors to their battlefield-gray uniforms. 

The Würzburg historian, Reinhard Freiherr von Bibra (1845–1926), in his study of Charles IV coronation (1916) published an image of the potential badge worn by the knights on their hats (a buttercup with golden spur and egret feathers), but he did not support it with sustainable historical sources. His aim goes back to some older descriptions telling that the Hungarian knights of golden spur wore a small gold spur not just on their boots, but beneath their hat buttercups, as well.

In 2011, the knightly society has been re-established as a real order in Esztergom (the first knightings were made on 30 April), under the name Aranysarkantyús Vitézi Lovagrend (Ordine Equitum Auratorum, Ritterorden vom Goldenen Sporn). The foundation was made by the knowledge of Otto von Habsburg (1912–2011), but without his direct participation. The order has three classes, but did not take over the 1918 decorative medal. (However, the badge resembles the medal described by Kassics in 1840.) For this reason, it has to be seen, as a distinct order. However, they confess themselves to the history of the Hungarian knights of golden spur. As the first grand master was appointed Count Sándor Habsburg-Lothringen (1965– ), member of the Tuscan branch of the Habsburg family.

References

Literature
József Pintér: Conspectus equestrium ordinum per Europam omnem florentium. Nagyszombat, 1742.

Adalbert Barics: A' magyar királyok' és királynék' koronáztatásoknak inneplése, melylynek szokott szer-tartásait Német nyelven le-írta és közre botsátotta N. Nemzetes Barits Albert, a' Törvénynek Tudósda, és a' Pesti. Királyi, Tudomány' Mindenese benn, ugyan azon, Törvénynek Tanítója. Magyarra fordította Lambach Elek, Kegyes Iskola-béli Pap, és a' Pesti Iskolákbann a' Szelídebb Tudományoknak Tanítójok. Pest, 1790. In German: Die gewöhnliche Krönungsfeyer der ungarischen Könige und Königinnen. Pest, 1790. 

Antal Cziráky: De Ordine Eqvitvm Avratorvm Hvngariae Antonii e Comitibvs Cziráky de 
Dienesfalva Exercitatio. Pest, 1792.

Ignácz Kisfaludi Kassics: Érdem koszorúk, vagy Értekezés A' Felséges Austriai, Császári és Királyi uralkodó Házat illető Jeles Rendekrűl, megtiszteltetésekrűl és jutalmazásokrúl, toldalékkép pedig Europában most virágzó egyéb Jeles Rendekrűl is. Vienna, 1840. 299–308.

Gergely Pál Sallay – János Szentváry-Lukács: Az aranysarkantyús vitézek jelvénye. In: A Hadtörténeti Múzeum Értesítője. 16. Budapest, 2016. 

Fanni Hende: Politikai reprezentáció a magyar országgyűléseken 1687 és 1765 között. Budapest, 2017. 97–102.

Johann Stolzer – Christian Steeb: Österreichs Orden vom Mittelalter bis zur Gegenwart. Graz, 1996. 197–202.

Václav Měřička: Orden und Ehrenzeichen der Österreichisch-Ungarischen Monarchie. Wien, 1974.

Günther Kronenbitter: Krieg im Frieden. Die Führung der k.u.k. Armee und die Großmachtpolitik Österreich-Ungarns 1906–1914. München, 2003.

Orders of chivalry of Hungary